Broadcasting-satellite service (short: BSS | also: broadcasting-satellite radiocommunication service ) is – according to Article 1.39 of the International Telecommunication Union's (ITU) Radio Regulations (RR) – defined as «A radiocommunication service in which signals transmitted or retransmitted by space stations are intended for direct reception by the general public. In the broadcasting-satellite service, the term “direct reception” shall encompass both individual reception and community reception.»

See also

Classification
This radiocommunication service is classified in accordance with ITU Radio Regulations (article 1) as follows: 
Broadcasting service (article 1.38)
Broadcasting-satellite service (article 1.32)

Frequency allocation
The allocation of radio frequencies is provided according to Article 5 of the ITU Radio Regulations (edition 2012).

In order to improve harmonisation in spectrum utilisation, the majority of service-allocations stipulated in this document were incorporated in national Tables of Frequency Allocations and Utilisations which is with-in the responsibility of the appropriate national frequency administration.

 Example of frequency allocation

See also
Satellite radio
Satellite television

References / sources 

 International Telecommunication Union (ITU)

Radiocommunication services ITU